Maria de Lourdes de Quinhones Levy (1921 - 27 June 2015) was a Portuguese physician. She received the second female doctorate of medicine in Portugal in 1958 after Cesina Bermudes. She was a pioneer in pediatric medicine.

Lourdes Levy was born in the island of São Tomé in São Tomé and Príncipe during the late colonial rule. (The last name Lourdes is pronounced as "loord".) She was a professor at the University of Lisbon and she was a service director in pediatric aid at Santa Maria Hospital.

She was awarded the title of Grand Officer of the Portuguese Order of Merit, which was presented to her in 1992 by the President at the time Mário Soares, as well as a silver medal by the Minister of Health and a medal by the Medical Order of Merit in 2003, among other distinctions.

Lourdes Levy was head of the Portuguese Pediatric Review, and two-time president of the nation's Pediatric Society. She was also a founder of the Portuguese League Against Epilepsy and the Society for Metabolic Diseases and the Institute for Child Support (Instituto de Apoio à Criança). She was a member of the Counselor of Orders of the Civil Merit during the presidency of Jorge Sampaio from 1996 to 2006.

She died in Lisbon on 27 June 2015.

References

1921 births
2015 deaths
Portuguese pediatricians
Academic staff of the University of Lisbon
Grand Officers of the Order of Merit (Portugal)
20th-century Portuguese physicians
Portuguese expatriates in São Tomé and Príncipe
Portuguese people of São Tomé and Príncipe descent